"Church in Ruins" is the sixth episode of the second season of the American anthology crime drama television series True Detective. It is the 14th overall episode of the series and was written by series creator Nic Pizzolatto and Scott Lasser, and directed by Miguel Sapochnik. It was first broadcast on HBO in the United States on July 26, 2015.

The season is set in California, and focuses on three detectives, Ray Velcoro (Colin Farrell), Ani Bezzerides (Rachel McAdams) and Paul Woodrugh (Taylor Kitsch), from three cooperating police departments and a criminal-turned-businessman named Frank Semyon (Vince Vaughn) as they investigate a series of crimes they believe are linked to the murder of a corrupt politician. In the episode, Velcoro, Bezzerides and Woodrugh start their next move in the undercover operation. Meanwhile, Semyon attempts to provide financial support for one of his deceased henchmen.

According to Nielsen Media Research, the episode was seen by an estimated 2.34 million household viewers and gained a 1.0 ratings share among adults aged 18–49. The episode received generally positive reviews from critics, who praised Sapochnik's directing, performances, and character development, although some that the pacing and lack of progress may not properly conclude all storylines.

Plot
Velcoro (Colin Farrell) confronts Semyon (Vince Vaughn) for giving him the wrong man as his ex-wife's rapist, assuming he used it just for corruption purposes. Semyon claims the man was truly the rapist at the time and even suggests Velcoro was already corrupt before he asked him for the tip. He warns him not to pursue him for the incident as it will bring repercussions, with both men aiming their guns at each other beneath the kitchen table. Before leaving, Velcoro asks Semyon to get him the man who tipped him off, which Semyon says he will do.

As the authorities investigate the shed at Guerneville, Woodrugh (Taylor Kitsch) follows up on the missing diamonds to find that they were part of a cache stolen during a double homicide and robbery in the 1992 riots that orphaned two children. Meanwhile, Semyon and Jordan (Kelly Reilly) visit Stan's widow and son, intending to provide some financial support for his family now that he died. He also talks with Stan's son to help him move on from his father's death. Later, he tortures a Mexican thug to meet with a cartel. He makes an agreement with the cartel to help find Irina provided the cartel are allowed to move drugs through his clubs.

Velcoro visits the real rapist (Marco Rodríguez) in prison and after confirming the encounter, promises to eventually kill him. He later meets Chad (Trevor Larcom) in a supervised visit, but the encounter feels uncomfortable as they need a woman to be present at all times with them. After the visit is over, he goes to his house where he starts binge drinking and snorting cocaine. He then calls Gena (Abigail Spencer), explaining he will drop the custody battle if she does not take the paternity test, which she agrees to do. 

Semyon finally contacts Irina, who claims that she stole Caspere's properties but only because she was hired by a man, presumably a police officer. Despite hesitating, she agrees to meet with him for more information. He and his henchmen arrive at the location, only to be joined by the cartel and they also discover that they have killed Irina. The cartel will maintain their partnership, explaining that they killed her for talking with the police.

With Woodrugh and Velcoro watching from afar, Bezzerides (Rachel McAdams) infiltrates a secret elite party, posing as her sister. She and other girls are put in a bus and taken to the party. Before meeting the hosts, they are all given drugs to consume. As Bezzerides wanders throughout the mansion, she starts hallucinating just as a man takes her. During this, Woodrugh inspects the area and catches Osip (Timothy V. Murphy) and Jacob McCandless (Jon Lindstrom) at an office discussing a partnership, with McCandless praising Osip for his involvement in the rail project. After they leave, Woodrugh enters the office and retrieves some documents.

As she is led through the mansion witnessing the orgy, Bezzerides hallucinates a man taunting her from a childhood memory. The effects prompt her to vomit the drugs in a bathroom. As she recovers, she finally discovers Vera (Miranda Rae Mayo) in the party. Men start grabbing Bezzerides so she stabs them, being forced to kill a guard as they escape the mansion. The rendezvous with Woodrugh just as more guards are deployed to catch them. Velcoro arrives in the car and they leave as they are shot by some guards. While Velcoro drives, Woodrugh tells him the documents point to a bigger conspiracy in the rail project.

Production

Development
In June 2015, the episode's title was revealed as "Church in Ruins" and it was announced that series creator Nic Pizzolatto and Scott Lasser had written the episode while Miguel Sapochnik had directed it. This was Pizzolatto's fourteenth writing credit, Lasser's second writing credit, and Sapochnik's first directing credit.

Reception

Viewers
The episode was watched by 2.34 million viewers, earning a 1.0 in the 18-49 rating demographics on the Nielson ratings scale. This means that 1 percent of all households with televisions watched the episode. This was a slight decrease from the previous episode, which was watched by 2.42 million viewers with a 1.0 in the 18-49 demographics.

Critical reviews
"Church in Ruins" received positive reviews from critics. The review aggregator website Rotten Tomatoes reported a 75% approval rating for the episode, based on 24 reviews, with an average rating of 7.26/10. The site's consensus states: "A nightmarish scene with Rachel McAdams and a strong performance from Vince Vaughn stand out in 'Church in Ruins', an episode that still suffers from the flaws of True Detectives overarching story in season two."

Matt Fowler of IGN gave the episode a "great" 8.3 out of 10 and wrote in his verdict, "While still not coming close to Season 1's intrigue, business has picked up in the second half of True Detectives Season 2. I even feel like this could all get wrapped up with a bow in one more episode, but, alas, there are two. So I'm not exactly sure what's going to take precedence - the land-grab deal or the individual problems of the main characters?"

Emily L. Stephens of The A.V. Club gave the episode a "B-" grade and wrote, "It's not the philosophical ramble or drawn-out character study of season one. It's a tumble of smut and poison and muddled mystery, a pulpy mess. And it's finally winding up the line that's been playing out all season. It feels like the second season of True Detective is getting to know itself a little bit, or like it knew itself all along and just didn't know it did." 

Alan Sepinwall of HitFix wrote, "When you balance the two sides out, there were more individual elements to feel positive about, but the completely inert nature of the mystery remains an enormous problem, even when the performances or direction have moments to shine. Better, but still True Detective season 2." Gwilym Mumford of The Guardian wrote, "This straightforward episode, bookended by two great set pieces, is the easiest to digest so far. But there are still an awful lot of loose ends to tie up." Ben Travers of IndieWire gave the episode a "B" grade and wrote, "One of the problems plaguing True Detective Season 2 has been over-emphasis. Whether you spot it in the writing, direction or line delivery, things have been a little too buy-the-book. For everything that worked about 'Church In Ruins' — and most of it did — there were very few surprises along the way to bolster the well-executed suspense."

Jeff Jensen of Entertainment Weekly wrote, "'Church in Ruins' was the first episode of True Detective this season that I enjoyed from start to finish without much reservation since episode 2. Maybe TV recapping Stockholm Syndrome is kicking in and I'm starting to fall for my captors, but Vince Vaughn's pretentious don't-call-him-a-gangster gangster didn't leave me too bothered or baffled with his pretentious patter, while Colin Farrell's Ray Velcoro didn’t make me laugh when he talked outrageously tough." Aaron Riccio of Slant Magazine wrote, "Less is more, and while True Detective must eventually start providing some of the answers to the many questions it has presented over the first two thirds of the season, it can surely find a more subtle, realistic way to do so." 

Kenny Herzog of Vulture gave the episode a 3 star rating out of 5 and wrote, "We're getting closer to some version of the truth as it pertains to Caspere's killer, but the tone of this noir fantasy is increasingly, resolutely bitter. The integrity of that jewelry-store heist back in ’92 was compromised, no different from the death shack Paul and Ani stumbled on up in the forest. No different from how the abuse Ani suffered at her commune or what Paul endured in Afghanistan has been that thing that’s torn them in two, how Ray's actions following Gena's assault have ravaged his conscience, or how parental neglect lead Frank to nihilism as a means of survival. It's no different, for that matter, from the riots themselves splitting Los Angeles in such a fashion that the haves may as well have cloistered themselves off in mansions with Eastern bloc hookers and cocaine while everyone else was left to ruthlessly claim what's theirs. Really, True Detective isn't any one character or city populous's world. It's just the world." Tony Sokol of Den of Geek gave the episode a 4.5 star rating out of 5 and wrote, "'Church in Ruins' found missing person, but it doesn't solve a thing. Hands down, this is the best episode so far in a series that's apparently still warming up." 

Carissa Pavlica of TV Fanatic gave the episode a 3.5 star rating out of 5 and wrote, "The best thing about this hour was the slight change in pace, switching up the music and letting our characters break out of what has become their standard operating procedure. They should have done it a lot sooner." Ronnie Stiernberg gof Paste gave the episode a 6.5 out of 10 and wrote, "And that, ultimately, remains True Detectives biggest problem: too many hamfisted backstories, not enough insight as to what exactly is going on and why we're supposed to care. With just two episodes left, it's time for this convoluted plot to get resolved, but is a satisfying ending even a possibility at this point, if the most compelling aspect of the show is a dropped paternity suit?"

References

External links
 "Church in Ruins" at HBO
 

2015 American television episodes
Television episodes directed by Miguel Sapochnik
Television episodes written by Nic Pizzolatto
True Detective episodes